Anita Queen Uwagbale is a Nigerian businesswoman and former beauty queen.

Edo-native Uwagbale spent most of her early years in Lagos until she gained admission into Madonna University, Port Harcourt to study Accountancy. As an undergraduate, Uwagbale was crowned Most Beautiful Girl in Nigeria 2004, enabling her to take part in Miss Universe and Miss World later in the year. At Miss World 2004 Uwagbale placed among the top 15 semi-finalists and was named African Continental Queen of Beauty. As MBGN, Uwagbale's platform was Environmental Pollution.

From 2008 to 2018, Uwagbale was married to businessman Tom Iseghohi, whom she met halfway through her reign as MBGN. Following a registry ceremony in America, the couple hosted a society wedding in Lagos in 2008, and are now the parents of two sons and one daughter. In 2009, he was accused of embezzling NITEL shareholders, but the charges were dropped.

Uwagbale continued to study in America while running her businesses which include motherhood retail chain The Baby Store. In May 2011, Uwagbale's baby store opened in the Chase Mall, along Ademola Adetokunbo street, Victoria Island, Lagos, Nigeria.

References

External links
Anita Wedding Day Feature
Miss World contestants
Continental queens of beauty, Miss World

1985 births
Living people
Miss Universe 2004 contestants
Miss World 2004 delegates
Most Beautiful Girl in Nigeria winners
 Residents of Lagos
 Edo people